White Notley railway station is on the Braintree Branch Line in the East of England, serving the village of White Notley, Essex. Its three-letter station code is WNY. The platform has an operational length for twelve-coach trains. In 2018/19 it was the least used station in Essex.

The station is currently managed by Greater Anglia, which also operates all trains serving it. On Sundays services terminate at Witham and passengers travelling on towards London must change for a connecting train.

Services are typically formed by Class 321 and Class 720 electric multiple units.

White Notley railway station featured in Geoff Marshall's YouTube series of Least Used Stations where his special guest was Andy Carter who also has his own YouTube channel called Calling All Stations.

References

External links

 

Railway stations in Essex
DfT Category F2 stations
Former Great Eastern Railway stations
Greater Anglia franchise railway stations
Railway stations in Great Britain opened in 1848